Front Page Woman is a 1935 American comedy film directed by Michael Curtiz. The screenplay by Laird Doyle, Lillie Hayward and Roy Chanslor based on the novel Women Are Bum Newspapermen by Richard Macauley.

Plot
Ellen Garfield refuses to marry fellow reporter Curt Devlin until he admits she is as good at her craft as any man. The two work for rival newspapers, and their ongoing efforts to better each other eventually leads to Ellen getting fired when Curt tricks her into misreporting the verdict of a murder trial. The tables are turned when she scoops him by getting the real perpetrator, Inez Cordoza, to confess to the crime. Forced to admit Ellen is a good reporter, he finally wins her hand.

Cast

 Bette Davis as Ellen Garfield 
 George Brent as Curt Devlin 
 Roscoe Karns as Toots O'Grady 
 Wini Shaw as Inez Cordoza 
 Walter Walker as Judge Hugo Rickard 
 J. Carrol Naish as Robert Cardoza 
 June Martel as Olive Wilson 
 J. Farrell MacDonald as Hallohan
 Dorothy Dare as Mae LaRue
 I. Stanford Jolley (uncredited; his first acting role)
 George Chandler as Reporter
 Adrian Morris as Guard

Production
The film's working title was Women Are Born Newspapermen. The plots of the 1937 release Back in Circulation, allegedly based on a story by Adela Rogers St. Johns, and the 1938 Torchy Blane film Blondes at Work are very similar to Front Page Woman.

The Warner Bros. release was one of three 1935 films co-starring Bette Davis and George Brent. The two were paired on-screen a total of thirteen times.

This was the fourth collaboration for Davis and director Michael Curtiz. The two worked together a total of seven times.

Critical reception
The New York Times said, "The three writers who adapted it . . . did a clever script job and Michael Curtiz directed at a brisk pace. Add to that a cast with a neat sense of comedy and you have an excellent tonic for the mid-July doldrums."

Variety said, "[It] lacks authenticity and is so far fetched it'll hand newsscribes around the country a constant run of ripples. But it's light and has some funny lines and situations."

References

External links
 
 
 
 

1935 romantic comedy films
American romantic comedy films
American black-and-white films
1930s English-language films
Films about journalists
Films directed by Michael Curtiz
Warner Bros. films
Films produced by Samuel Bischoff
Films scored by Heinz Roemheld
1935 films
1930s American films